Aplysiopsis enteromorphae is a species of sacoglossan sea slug, a shell-less marine opisthobranch gastropod mollusk in the family Hermaeidae.

Distribution
This species is known to be present along the western coast of North America from Alaska to Mexico.

References

Hermaeidae
Gastropods described in 1905